Evi Kent (born 1939) was a Czech-born German film, stage and television actress and also enjoyed some success as a singer. 

She was born in Brünn in Czechoslovakia, shortly before it was Occupied by Germany. She later settled in West Germany following the Expulsion of Germans from Czechoslovakia after the Second World War and studied acting in Berlin. One of her first film roles was in Robert Siodmak's My Father, the Actor.

Selected filmography
 Mamitschka (1955)
 My Father, the Actor (1956)
 Friederike von Barring (1956)
 Jede Nacht in einem anderen Bett (1957)
 Our Crazy Aunts (1961)
 Dance with Me into the Morning (1962)
 Verrückt und zugenäht (1962)
 No Kissing Under Water (1962)
 Our Crazy Nieces (1963)
 Allotria in Zell am See (1963)
 Happy-End am Wörthersee (1964)
 The World Revolves Around You (1964)
 Blue Blooms the Gentian (1973)

References

Bibliography
 Greco, Joseph. The File on Robert Siodmak in Hollywood, 1941–1951. Universal-Publishers, 1999.

External links

1939 births
Living people
Czech film actresses
German film actresses
People from Brno